Gérard Deschamps (born 1937) is a French contemporary artist associated with the Nouveau réalisme movement.

Career 
Deschamps was born in Lyon, France. His first exhibition took place in 1955 at the Gallery Fachetti in Paris. At this time he abandoned traditional oil painting techniques, which he said lacked flexibility, and turned to making collages that incorporate pictures of items from Manufrance catalogs. In 1957, he exhibited at the Galerie du Haut Pave in Paris paintings made of rags and pleating and in November that year, he was sent to Algeria for 27 months of military service.

Back in Paris, in 1960 he met Raymond Hains and Jacques Villeglé and officially joined the New Realist group in 1961 (a year after its official founding). That year he began using U.S. Army tarps with fluorescent colors in his work. He also worked with rags from Japanese and Belgian advertising, as well as sheets of plastic kitchenware patchwork. In the same period, he also used armor plates and metal enclosures that served to isolate aircraft engines.

In 1965 he created bananas, made of folded and colored wire, which can be up to 8 meters long and can produce moiré patterns.

In 1970 Deschamps moved to La Châtre, home of his grandparents.

Since then, his creative activity is ongoing, and he shows in exhibitions and galleries in Paris and abroad.

In 1980, Deschamps produced playful outfits made of assemblies of swimwear, balloons, skateboards and surfboards, which bring Pop Art to mind. In the 1990s, he created colorful beach ball blends packed in nets, and then, in 2001, skateboards.

Main exhibitions 

1955: Galerie Fachetti, Paris
1957: Galerie Colette Allendy, Paris
1962: Galerie  J, Paris; Galerie Ursula Girardon, Paris
1963: Galleria Appolinaire, Milan
1964: Galerie Florence Houston Brown, Paris
1965: Galerie Ad Libidum, Anvers
1966: Galleria l'Elefante, Venise
1979: Galerie Dominique Marches, Chateauroux
1988: Galerie Le Gall Peyroulet, Paris
1990: Galerie Le Gall Peyroulet, Paris
1991: Galerie Le Gall Peyroulet, Paris
1993: Galerie Der Spiegel, Cologne
1998: Fondation Cartier, Paris
1998: Galerie de La Châtre, Paris
2000: Galerie de La Châtre, Paris
2002: Galleria Peccolo Livorno
2002: Galerie de La Châtre, Paris
2003: Musée de l'Hospice Saint Roch, Issoudun
2004 Musée des Beaux-Arts de Dole
2005 Château d'Ars La Châtre; Musée des Beaux-Arts d'Orléans
2006 Le Safran Amiens
2007 Galerie de La Châtre, Paris
2008 Musee des ARTS DECORATIFS Paris
2009 Châteauroue, manifestation d'art contemporain à Châteauroux
2009 solo show FIAC Paris galerie Martine et Thibaul de La Châtre
2011   Lieu  D Art Contemporain  L Arboretum  Argenton sur Creuse
2012  Wave Attack; l Identité Remarquable  Orleans 
2013  Deschamps / Hains  Musée de l Hospice Saint Roch Issoudun
2013  Deschamps / Maucotel  Lieu  D Art Contemporain  Montlucon
2014  Deschamps  : Ma Premiere Galerie Paris 
2016  Du Passé Au Present : Galerie Gilles Peyroulet Paris 
2018  Paris Art FAIR  Galerie Grimont 
2018  Skate Boards et Street Art Luxembourg Art Fair

Sources 
 Dictionnaire de l'art moderne et contemporain, nlle. éd., Paris, Éditions Hazan, 2006, 194 pages (French)
 www.gerarddeschamps.org (French)
 Gérard Deschamps, homo accessoirus, interview with Hélène Kelmachter, Actes Sud, 1998 (French)
 Gerard Deschamps, Retrospective, Musee de L Hospice Saint-Roch Issoudun et Musée des Beaux Arts de Dole
 Gerard Deschamps, Galerie Martine et Thibault de La Chatre  FIAC 2009
 Gerard Deschamps, L Arboretum Lieu d Art Contemporain  Argenton Sur Creuse 2011 
 Gerard Deschamps, Editions du Regard 2017 
 Gerard Deschamps, Editions Art Passion Luxembourg Art Fair 2018

External links 
Non official website dedicated to Gérard Deschamps, in French, with many pictures

1937 births
Living people
Artists from Lyon
French contemporary artists